Andrew Patrick Wood (January 8, 1966 – March 19, 1990) was an American musician. He was the lead singer and lyricist for the alternative rock bands Malfunkshun and Mother Love Bone. Wood formed Malfunkshun in 1980 with his older brother Kevin Wood on guitar and Regan Hagar on drums. The band used alter ego personas onstage, with Wood using the name Landrew the Love Child. Though the band only had two songs released, "With Yo' Heart (Not Yo' Hands)" and "Stars-n-You", on the Deep Six compilation album, they are often cited as being among the "founding fathers" of the Seattle grunge movement. During his time in Malfunkshun, Wood started relying heavily on drugs, entering rehab in 1985.

By 1988, Malfunkshun had disbanded and Wood began jamming with Green River members Stone Gossard and Jeff Ament. They soon began writing original material and formed Mother Love Bone the same year, adding guitarist Bruce Fairweather (also a former member of Green River) and drummer Greg Gilmore to the lineup. The following year, the band signed a deal with PolyGram, issuing a six-song EP, Shine, before going on tour, supporting The Dogs D'Amour. Towards the end of the year, the band recorded their debut album, Apple, which was scheduled for release in 1990.

Due to his struggle with drug addiction, Wood checked himself into rehab in 1989, hoping to get clean for the release of Mother Love Bone's debut album. He died in Seattle on March 19, 1990, at the age of 24, after being found in a comatose state by his girlfriend following a heroin overdose.

Biography

Early life
Wood was born in Columbus, Mississippi, to David C. Wood and Toni Wood, and raised in Bainbridge Island, Washington. He was the youngest of three children; he had two older brothers, Kevin and Brian. Wood and his brothers were exposed to various types of music by their parents, who also supported their children when they were learning how to play instruments. Wood became a fan of acts such as Elton John, Queen, Aerosmith, and Kiss.

Career

Malfunkshun (1980–1988)

In 1980, at the age of 14, Wood formed Malfunkshun with his brother Kevin, recording their first demo tape in April 1980. Drummer Regan Hagar joined soon after with the band, playing shows in Seattle, Washington. Each member adopted onstage alter egos, with Andrew becoming Landrew the Love Child, Kevin becoming Kevinstein, and Hagar becoming Thundarr. Unlike most grunge groups in Seattle, Malfunkshun were influenced by glam rock with Wood described as "a hippie, glammed-out rock & roll god, equal parts Marc Bolan and Jim Morrison," with his look and vocal style influenced by frontmen such as Freddie Mercury, Paul Stanley, and Marc Bolan. Wood developed a drug habit at a young age, having smoked marijuana and cigarettes at the age of around 11 or 12.  By 1985, he had started to rely heavily on drugs to help with his "rock star" persona, and entered rehab the same year.

Malfunkshun recorded a number of demos in 1986, two of which, "With Yo' Heart (Not Yo' Hands)" and "Stars-n-You," were included on the "legendary" Deep Six compilation album released by C/Z Records the same year. The band continued to play shows in Seattle, opening for Soundgarden, The U-Men, and Skin Yard. However, in 1988, Malfunkshun disbanded.

Although the band never released an album and were also turned down by Sub Pop for "not [being] grunge enough," Malfunkshun, along with Green River, are often cited as "founding fathers" of the Seattle's grunge movement.

Mother Love Bone and final years (1988–1990)

Wood and Hagar began playing with Stone Gossard and Jeff Ament of Green River, which disbanded in 1988, performing, on occasion, as the cover band Lords of the Wasteland. Former Green River guitarist Bruce Fairweather was added to the lineup, while former 10 Minute Warning and Skin Yard drummer Greg Gilmore replaced Hagar, forming Mother Love Bone the same year.

The band soon signed a deal with PolyGram, and, through their own subsidiary label Stardog, issued a six-song EP, Shine, in 1989. John Book, of Allmusic, stated that the EP "contributed to the buzz about the Seattle music scene." The band spent the rest of the year touring, including shows supporting The Dogs D'Amour, and recording their debut album. With high expectations of the album, Wood checked himself into rehab due to his struggle with heroin addiction, hoping to get clean for the release of the album, staying there for the remainder of the year.

In 1990, the band continued to play shows in Seattle, waiting for the release of their album, Apple. Wood died only weeks before the release of the record. Some rock critics consider them to be one of the greatest bands of the Grunge era.

Death
On March 16, 1990, Wood was found in a comatose state by his girlfriend, having overdosed on heroin. Wood was taken to Harborview Hospital and placed on life support. On March 19, physicians suggested that Wood be removed from life support and he was pronounced dead at 3:15 pm that day. The official cause of death recorded on Wood's death certificate is hypoxic encephalopathy. Wood's remains were cremated.
His burial site is located at Miller-Woodlawn Memorial Park in Bremerton, Washington.

Apple was released posthumously later in the year, receiving positive reviews. David Browne of The New York Times wrote that "Apple may be one of the first great hard-rock records of the 90s" and that "Andrew Wood could have been the first of the big-league Seattle rock stars."

Legacy
Shortly following Wood's death, former roommate and friend Chris Cornell of Soundgarden wrote two songs, "Reach Down" and "Say Hello 2 Heaven", as a tribute. Cornell approached Gossard and Ament about releasing the songs as singles before collaborating on an album. Adding drummer Matt Cameron, future Pearl Jam lead guitarist Mike McCready, and future Pearl Jam lead singer Eddie Vedder, they formed Temple of the Dog in 1990 to pay tribute to Wood, releasing one self-titled album in 1991.

Fellow Seattle band Alice in Chains dedicated their debut album Facelift to Wood. The song "Would?", included in their second album Dirt and on the soundtrack to the film Singles (1992), was written as an ode to Wood. In the liner notes of Alice in Chains' Music Bank box set collection, Jerry Cantrell said of the song:

In 1992, PolyGram reissued both Shine and Apple as the compilation album Mother Love Bone, while the song "Chloe Dancer/Crown of Thorns" was included on the soundtrack to the film Singles. The same year, Los Angeles band Faster Pussycat wrote the song "Mr. Lovedog", from the album Whipped!, in tribute to Wood. Bradley Torreano of Allmusic stated that the song "offered a sad elegy to another charismatic figure in the metal world."

Seattle rock band War Babies, which briefly featured Mother Love Bone's Jeff Ament on bass, dedicated the song "Blue Tomorrow" off their eponymous 1992 debut album to Wood. In 1993, Seattle grunge band Candlebox released their self-titled debut featuring the single "Far Behind", which was written in Wood's memory.

Wood's former bandmate Stone Gossard compiled Malfunkshun recordings from 1986 to 1987 and released the studio album Return to Olympus through his Loosegroove Records label in 1995. In 2005, director Scot Barbour completed production on the documentary Malfunkshun: The Andrew Wood Story. The film documents Wood's music career as well as his family background. The film premiered at the Seattle International Film Festival. In October of the same year, the film was screened at the FAIF Film Festival in Hollywood, California. The film was released in 2011 on DVD as part of a 2CD+DVD set entitled "Malfunkshun: The Andrew Wood Story" including the Return to Olympus album, a bonus CD including many interviews and demos, and the movie on the DVD disc.

In 2011, the album Melodies & Dreams was released. It featured unreleased songs and demos that Wood recorded throughout his life, including a song that he recorded with Chris Cornell, "Island of Summer", which is the only existing recording with the two of them singing together. Wood is featured in the 2011 documentary Pearl Jam Twenty, about the story of Pearl Jam. Friends including Chris Cornell, Jeff Ament and Stone Gossard talk about him in the film and home-made footage featuring Wood is shown.

Discography

Other appearances

Videography

References

1966 births
1990 deaths
Grunge musicians
American rock singers
American multi-instrumentalists
Singers from Mississippi
Mother Love Bone members
Deaths by heroin overdose in Washington (state)
Musicians from Bainbridge Island, Washington
People from Columbus, Mississippi
Musicians from Seattle
20th-century American singers
Glam rock musicians
Singers from Washington (state)
20th-century American male singers